Sexy, Free & Single (reissue name Spy) is the sixth Korean studio album of South Korean boy band Super Junior. It was released on July 4, 2012, by SM Entertainment, distributed by KMP Holdings and available from online music portal sites at midnight on July 1, 2012. It is their first album in 11 months following Mr. Simple released in August 2011. This was followed by the release of Version B on July 16, with a different cover which features the 10 members in their teaser photo makeup. A repackaged edition, re-titled Spy was released on August 6, with four new tracks including follow-up single "Spy".

This album marks the return of member Kangin, who was discharged from his mandatory military service in April 2012, and the first time with Super Junior in three years since October 2009; but the first one without Heechul, who enlisted in September 2011, and the last with leader Leeteuk and Yesung before their military service, enlisting on October 30, 2012, and on May 6, 2013, respectively. This is the third album that features ten of the 13 members from the group, following Bonamana in 2010 and their fifth album Mr. Simple.

The album won Album of the Year at the 14th Mnet Asian Music Awards and Disc Daesang at the 27th Golden Disc Awards. According to the Gaon Album Chart, as of the end of December 2012, the album has sold a cumulative total of 510,000 copies domestically.

Background
On June 21, 2012, the first teaser photo, showing the theme of 'Beautiful men' was released, showing Eunhyuk in a white shirt, blue jeans, styled with a mullet-like hairstyle and blindfolded with white and pink flowers. This was followed by Donghae's teaser photo on June 22, with him dressed in a black mesh shirt with a white lace veil over his head. On June 23, the teaser photos of Leeteuk, with platinum silver hair, a gold necklace and heavy black eye makeup; and Ryeowook with red hair and feathers, were released. The following day on June 24, Yesung's and Shindong's photos were released, in which Yesung is partially bare chested with a crown of branches on his head and Shindong is frozen with light blue highlights in his hair. The teasers continued on June 25, with the release of Kangin and Sungmin's photos, showing a slim downed Kangin with a frosty look and a net-like veil over his head; and a side-profiled Sungmin with a feminized look and long blonde hair holding a large bouquet of baby’s breath flowers. On the same day Leeteuk also tweeted another version of his teaser photo with the same outfit but in a different pose leaning on his hand looking as he was in a deep contemplation. The final teasers displaying Siwon and Kyuhyun were released on June 26, showing Siwon with long blonde hair under a dip-dyed hat that matches his green eyebrows; and lastly Kyuhyun in a side profile looking upwards with a pale white gold face.

Music and video
Leeteuk expressed that they had wanted to try out different music and dance styles in this album, as the songs from their third to fifth albums have been similar. Sungmin further explained saying, "The songs on our previous albums mostly featured mechanical sounds effects and catchy rhythms, but this time we tried to diversify into various genres such as ballads, R&B, and covers of old songs, without relying on special audio effects as much".

The title track "Sexy, Free & Single" describes the sexy and free life of a single man in a soulful Eurohouse genre with an easy and infectious chorus. It is composed and arranged by Danish songwriters Daniel 'Obi' Klein, Thomas Sardorf and Lasse Lindorff. The second lead track is "From U", a med-tempo R&B track dedicated to their fans. It talks about their gratitude towards them and their bickering yet loving relationship. The third track "Now" is about taking a break away from everyday life and going to the beach and "Rockstar" is a club and electronic mixed track with hip hop. "Gulliver" is written by Eunhyuk and features rap by him, Leeteuk, Donghae and Shindong, with vocals by Ryeowook. The track "Someday" is a cover version of a Lee Sang-eun song, while "Bittersweet" is sung by Kyuhyun, Yesung, Sungmin and Ryeowook. On June 30, SM Entertainment released a minute-and-a-half highlight medley of tracks from the album on YouTube featuring previously unreleased teaser photos.

The group reportedly filmed a music video in Namyangju, Gyeonggi Province, with a Devin Jamieson-choreographed dance for "Sexy, Free & Single". Jamieson had previously worked with artists such as BoA, Michael Jackson, Britney Spears and Hilary Duff. In addition, their performance also benefited from the support provided by other choreographers such as Lyle Beniga, Nick Baga and Devon Perri.

On June 29, the teaser for the MV was released on their official YouTube channel, which was followed by the full music video on July 3. Sexy, Free & Single MV achieved 1 000 000 views in only 12 hours.

Repackaged album
The repackaged edition, re-titled Spy, includes four new tracks with follow-up single "Spy", an urban dance track. "Only U" was composed by Leeteuk and Lee Jae-myoung (who previously wrote for the group's tracks "Marry U" and "Happy Together") with the lyrics by Leeteuk and Donghae. "Haru" was co-written by Donghae and Urban Zakapa's Kwon Sun-il while "Outsider" is a hip hop dance track. The MV teaser for "Spy" was released on August 3, followed by the full MV on August 13, 2012. The repackaged edition ranked number one on the Gaon Weekly Album Chart in its first week of release, remaining in the top three for five weeks, and ranking number one on the Gaon Monthly Album Chart of August.

Promotion and reception
A press conference, attended by the 10 active members, was held on July 3 to launch the album. It attracted media and international reporters from Taiwan, China, Japan and Kazakhstan. It also marks Kangin's first official activity since being discharged. They made their official comeback on Mnet's M! Countdown on July 5, performing "Sexy, Free & Single" and "From U". This marks the on-stage reunion with Kangin and his first performance in two years. Further proving their global popularity, Super Junior’s press conference for their sixth album was recently covered by a popular Polish news station.

The album peaked at number three on the Billboard World Albums chart. According to Hanteo, Super Junior became the first artist in 2012 to surpass 200,000 copies sold with Sexy, Free & Single. Sexy, Free & Single managed to sell 335,744 copies in one month according to Gaon, reaching 1st place on all albums charts. Super Junior ranked 1st place on Hanteo's "Top 5 K-Pop Artists" 2012, winning the Hanteo Singer Award, and also won the 2012 Hanteo Album Award. The Japanese version of the "Sexy, Free & Single" single, which was released on August 22, sold over 118,902 units and was certified Gold for selling over 100,000 units. The album won Album of the Year at the 14th Mnet Asian Music Awards and Disc Daesang at the 27th Golden Disc Awards.

Accolades

Track listing

Notes
 – Hangulization of

Charts

Album charts

Charted songs

Sales

Personnel 
As listed in the liner notes:

 Super Junior – vocals, background vocals
 Lee Soo-man – producer
 SM Entertainment – executive producer
 Yoo Young-jin – recording, mixing, background vocals (on "Sexy, Free & Single" and "From U"), director (on "Sexy, Free & Single" and "From U")
 Nam Gung-jin – recording, mixing
 Lee Seong-ho – recording
 Gu Jong-pil – recording, mixing
 Jeong Eui-seok – recording, mixing
 Jeong Eun-kyung – recording
 Oh Seung-geun – recording
 Kim Heon-gon – recording
 Jeon Hun - mastering
 Park Seong-in – stylist
 Yuna – make-up artist
 Park Nae-ju – make-up artist
 Choi Dae-kyun – hair stylist
 Hyeon Yun-soo – hair stylist
 Min Hee-jin – design
 Han Jong-cheol – photography
 Kim Young-min – executive supervisor

"Now"
 hitchhiker – director, guitar, bass guitar

"Rockstar"
 D20 (detour) Peter & Young Sky – director
 Jeong Su-wan – guitar

"Gulliver"
 hitchhiker – director, guitar, keyboard

"Someday"
 Park Chang-hyun – director
 Kang Su-ho – drums 
 Choi Hoon – bass guitar
 Go Tae-young – guitar 
 Jung – string
 Jeong Min-ji – string arrangement and conducting
 Jason Lee – brass, saxophone
 Jo Jung-hyun – brass
 Park Kyung-geon – brass

"Bittersweet"
 Kenzie – director, piano
 Choi Hoon – bass guitar
 Kim Jung-bae – guitar
 Jung – string
 Lee Na-il – string arrangement and conducting

"Butterfly"
 Hwang Hyun – director
 Jeong Su-wan – guitar

"Daydream"
 Ha Seong-ho – director
 Lee Su-jun – guitar
 Storyteller – keyboard
 Gil Sang-jun – background vocals

"A 'Good'bye"
 Park Chang-hyun – director
 Go Tae-young – guitar
 Jung – string
 Park In-young – string arrangement and conducting

Release history

References

External links
 Super Junior official homepage  
 Super Junior official YouTube channel

2012 albums
Super Junior albums
SM Entertainment albums
Korean-language albums
Grand Prize Golden Disc Award-winning albums